Autopsia is a European art project focused on music and visual production, gathering authors of different professions in the realization of multimedia projects. Its art practice began in London in the late 1970s and continued during the 1980s in the former Yugoslavia. Since 1990, Autopsia has been based in Prague, Czechia.

At the beginning of its activity, Autopsia issued dozens of mini-recordings. In the period after 1989, twenty CDs were issued, at first for Staalplaat, then for German label Hypnobeat and London's Gymnastic Records. One of its compositions is a part of the soundtrack for Peter Greenaway's The Pillow Book (1996).

Discography

Studio albums
 Autopsia (1985)
 Oscularum Infame (1987)
 In Vivo 1981-1983 (1985)
 In Vivo (1988)
 International Aeterna (1988)
 Death Is the Mother of Beauty (1990)
 Palladium (1991)
 The Birth of the Crystal Power (1993)
 Humanity Is the Devil 1604–1994 (1995)
 Mystery Science (1996)
 The Berlin Requiem (2006)
 Radical Machines Night Landscapes (2008)
 Autopsia: Karl Rossmann Fragments (2008)
 Damnatio Memoriae (2017)
 Apophenia (2018)
 Innenräume (2020)

EPs
 The Knife (1989)
 Requiem Pour un Empire (1991)
 Waldsinfonie: The Silence of the Lamb (1993)
 White Christmas (1994)
 Secret Christmas History (1995)
 The Secret Block For a Secret Person in Ireland (2002)
 Reconstructed EP Vol.1 (2020)
 Reconstructed EP Vol.2 (2020)

Compilations
 Wound (1991)
 Prager Kodex (1995)
 In Vivo 1984–1992 (1998)
 Colonia (2002)
 Le Chant de la Nuit (2005)
 Factory Rituals (2008)
 Weltuntergang (2011)
 Metal (2015)
 In Vivo (2016)

Singles
 "Radical Machine /1.0/" (2005)
 "Silently the Wolves are Watching" (2007)

Other appearances
 "Song of Hate" (Swallowing Scrap Metal; 1984)
 "Lebensherrgabe" (SNX; 1985)
 "Lebensherrgabe" (Sounds Beyond the Grave – International Compilation; 1986)
 "The Eleventh Key" (19 Keys 19 Bands; 1986)
 "Relax" (Notre Dame; 1987)
 "Lebensherrgabe" (The Second Slovene Wave; 1987)
 "Kissing Jesus In The Dark, Part I" / "Kissing Jesus in the Dark, Part II" (Yugoslavian Sound Poetry; 1987)
 "Oh No! Hopeless!" (The Cassette Played Poptones; 1988)
 "Does the Knife Cry When It Enters the Skin" (Journey Into Pain; 1989)
 "Scars of Europe" (La Révolution... Électroacoustique; 1990)
 "Show Me Your Wound (Live)" (Mjölnir; 1990)
 "War in Heaven" (The Lamp of the Invisible Light; 1991)
 "Does the Knife Cry When It Enters the Skin"(Journey Into Pain; 1992)
 "His Secret Sin" (Made in Yugoslavia; 1992)
 "Erwachen Des Waldes" (Chang'e – Hyperium Asia Compilation; 1993)
 "Prologue" (Zauber of Music Volume II; 1995)
 "In Hora Mortis No.12 (Autopsia Arrangement)" / "Crowd Together and Work Up at the Sky" (Prager Kodex; 1995)
 "Damned" (Knights of Abyss; 1995)
 "Stille Nacht (g)RAVE Remix" (Excelsis – A Dark Noël; 1995)
 "Erwachen Des Waldes" (Hypnobeats; 1995)
 "Je suis La Resurrection" (The Pillow Book OST; 1996)
 "Erwachen Des Waldes" (Hyperium New Classics Vol. 1; 1997)
 "Erwachen Des Waldes" (Hypnotic & Hypersonic; 1998)
 "Stille Nacht (g)RAVE Remix" (Excelsis; 2001)
 "Nachtlandschaft" (Statement 1961; 2004)
 "Space Conquerer" (Энергия; 2007)
 "Fragment II" (OEC 100; 2008)
 Pannonien (Klangpostkarten Aus Südosteuropa; 2010)
 "Hudci" (Unite – A Gathering Of Strangers; 2010)

Books
 Autopsia written by Vladimir Mattioni, published by The Museum of Contemporary Art of Vojvodina in Novi Sad (2012) 
 Apocrypha written by Autopsia, published by UPI2M Zagreb (2013) 
 Thanatopolis written by Alexei Monroe, published by Divus London (2016)

Videography
 The Czech Book of the Dead (Illuminating Technologies; 2006)
 Flamme (Illuminating Technologies; 2006)
 Factory Rituals (Illuminating Technologies; 2009)
 Karl Rossmann Fragments (Illuminating Technologies; 2010)
 Autopsia Short Films (Illuminating Technologies; 2010)

References

External links
 
 Autopsia at Bandcamp
 Autopsia at Discogs
 Autopsia at YouTube
 Autopsia at Allmusic
 Autopsia at Rateyourmusic
 Autopsia at Minds

British industrial music groups
English alternative rock groups
English experimental musical groups
English electronic music groups
English new wave musical groups
Serbian alternative rock groups
Serbian new wave musical groups
Serbian post-punk music groups
Serbian experimental musical groups
Czech ambient music groups
Czech alternative rock groups
Breakbeat music groups
Martial industrial groups
Musical groups established in 1978
Czech experimental music groups
Czech electronic music groups
Czech industrial music groups
Dark ambient music groups
Serbian noise rock groups
Serbian dark wave musical groups
1978 establishments in the United Kingdom